Sherlock Holmes: A Game of Shadows is a 2011 period mystery action film and the sequel to the 2009 film Sherlock Holmes, both which star Robert Downey Jr. as the titular character. The film is directed by Guy Ritchie and produced by Joel Silver, Lionel Wigram, Susan Downey and Dan Lin. The film's screenplay was written by Michele Mulroney and Kieran Mulroney. Downey Jr. and Jude Law reprised their roles as Holmes and Watson, respectively, alongside Noomi Rapace as Madame Simza "Sim" Heron, Stephen Fry as Mycroft Holmes, Jared Harris as Professor Moriarty, and Rachel McAdams as Irene Adler. Although the film follows an original premise, it incorporates more closely elements of Conan Doyle's short stories, including "The Final Problem" (1893) and "The Adventure of the Empty House" (1903). In the film, Holmes and Watson travel across Europe with a Romani adventuress to foil an intricate plot by their cunning nemesis, Professor Moriarty, to instigate a major European conflict.

Though the film received mixed reviews from critics, with praise for the action scenes and the performances of Downey Jr., Law, and Harris, but criticism over the poor use of Fry, Rapace, McAdams and Kelly Reilly, it was commercially successful, with a worldwide gross of over $543 million. A third film is currently in development hell.

Plot
In 1891, Irene Adler delivers a package to Dr. Hoffmanstahl, payment for completing a recent surgery, while Hoffmanstahl hands Adler a letter. Hoffmanstahl opens the package, triggering a bomb that is prevented from detonating by Sherlock Holmes. Holmes takes the letter while Adler and Hoffmanstahl escape. Hoffmanstahl is assassinated by Moriarty's henchman, Sebastian Moran. Adler meets with Professor Moriarty to explain the events, but Moriarty, deeming her compromised, poisons and kills her. 

Holmes discloses to Dr. Watson at 221B Baker Street that he is investigating seemingly unrelated murders, terrorist attacks and business acquisitions that he has connected to Moriarty. After meeting with his brother Mycroft at Watson's bachelor party, Holmes meets with Gypsy fortune-teller Madame Simza, the intended recipient of the letter he took from Adler, sent by her brother René. Holmes defeats an assassin sent to kill Simza and she departs. After the wedding of Watson and Mary Morstan, Holmes meets Moriarty for the first time. Moriarty taunts Holmes about murdering Adler, and that he will kill Watson and Mary due to Holmes' interference, with Holmes vowing to defeat him. 

Moriarty's men attack Watson and Mary on a train to their honeymoon to Brighton. Holmes throws Mary from the train into a river, where she is rescued by Mycroft. After defeating Moriarty's men, Holmes and Watson travel to Paris and locate Simza. Holmes tells Simza that she has been targeted because René is working for Moriarty and may have told her his plans. Simza takes the pair to the headquarters of an anarchist group to which she and René belonged; the anarchists have been forced to plant bombs for Moriarty. The trio follow Holmes' deduction that the bomb is in the Paris Opera. However, the bomb is in a nearby hotel; its explosion kills a number of businessmen. The bomb was a cover for the assassination of Alfred Meinhard by Moran. 

Meinhard's death grants Moriarty ownership of Meinhard's arms factory in Germany. Holmes spies on Moriarty, learning he is travelling to Germany. The trio follow him there. At the factory, Moriarty captures, interrogates, and tortures Holmes while Watson fights Moran. Holmes spells out Moriarty's plot, revealing that the Professor acquired shares in multiple war profiteering companies and intends to instigate a major world war to make himself a fortune. Watson uses the cannon he was hiding behind to destroy the watchtower in which Moran is concealed. The structure collapses into the warehouse where Moriarty is holding Holmes captive. Watson, Simza, and an injured Holmes reunite and Holmes deduces that Moriarty's final target will be a peace summit in Switzerland, creating an international incident. At the summit, Holmes deduces that René is the assassin and is disguised as one of the ambassadors, having been given radical reconstructive surgery by Hoffmanstahl. 

Holmes and Moriarty meet on a balcony to discuss their plans over a game of chess. Watson and Simza stop René's assassination attempt; René is then killed by Moran, who flees. Despite his war being averted, Moriarty remains confident in his victory, warning Holmes that the nations of Europe will inevitably go to war with one another regardless of Moriarty's manipulations. Holmes reveals that, while being tortured by Moriarty, he replaced the professor's personal diary that contained his plans and financing with a duplicate. The original was sent to Mary, who decrypted the code using a book Holmes had noticed in Moriarty's office, before passing the information to Inspector Lestrade, who seizes Moriarty's assets and donates his fortune to charities that help war widows and orphans. Holmes and Moriarty anticipate a fight, and both realise that Moriarty will win due to Holmes' injured shoulder. Out of options and with Moriarty vowing to kill Watson and Mary, Holmes grabs Moriarty and lunges backwards over the balcony, just as Watson shows up, and into the Reichenbach Falls below, to their deaths.

Following Holmes's funeral, Watson and Mary prepare to have their belated honeymoon when Watson receives a package containing a breathing device of Mycroft's that Holmes expressed a liking for before the summit. Realizing that Holmes may still be alive, Watson leaves his office to find the delivery man. Holmes, having concealed himself in Watson's office, reads Watson's memoirs on the typewriter and adds a question mark after the words "The End".

Cast

 Robert Downey Jr. as Sherlock Holmes
 Jude Law as Dr. John Watson
 Jared Harris as Professor James Moriarty
 Noomi Rapace as Madame Simza "Sim" Heron
 Stephen Fry as Mycroft Holmes
 Kelly Reilly as Mary Morstan
 Rachel McAdams as Irene Adler
 Eddie Marsan as Inspector Lestrade
 Paul Anderson as Sebastian Moran
 Geraldine James as Mrs. Hudson
 Thierry Neuvic as Claude Ravache
 Fatima Adoum as a Manouche
 Wolf Kahler as Dr. Hoffmanstahl
 Affif Ben Badra as Tamas Morato
 William Houston as Constable Clark

Production
After the success of the 2009 film Sherlock Holmes, a sequel was fast-tracked by Warner Bros. with director Guy Ritchie dropping out of an adaptation of Lobo and Robert Downey Jr. leaving Cowboys & Aliens. It was unclear if Rachel McAdams would appear in the film; McAdams said, "If I do, it won't be a very big thing. It's not a lead part." Warner Bros. later confirmed to Entertainment Weekly that McAdams would play a part in the sequel but that it would be a cameo appearance. The female lead role was played by Noomi Rapace. Joel Silver, the film's producer, has said that "we always intended to have a different kind of girl for each movie" in the vein of Bond girls. He found it "complicated" to persuade McAdams to return in a smaller role: "She loved being with us, but she hoped to have a bigger role."

The film, then under the working title of Sherlock Holmes 2, was reported to be influenced by Conan Doyle's "The Final Problem". While the film took place a year after the events of the first film, Sherlock Holmes: A Game of Shadows was intended to be a stand-alone film that did not require knowledge of the previous movie.

In October 2010, the steamship PS Waverley was chartered on the English Channel for filming, and a large green screen was erected at Didcot Railway Centre, where a large action scene was filmed the following month. In late November, a scene was filmed at Victoria Bridge in Worcestershire, England. In January 2011, scenes were also filmed at Hampton Court Palace and areas in Oxford University.

In early February 2011, principal photography moved for two days to Strasbourg, France. Shooting took place on, around, and inside Strasbourg Cathedral. The scene was said at the time to be the opening scene of the film, as it covered an assassination and bombing in a German-speaking town.

The production also filmed at several locations in Kent including Fort Amherst, Knole, and The Historic Dockyard Chatham. The White Cliffs of Dover are also briefly featured in the movie, as is the Old Royal Naval College in Greenwich. Several scenes were also filmed at Elstree Studios in Hertfordshire.

Music

Hans Zimmer composed the film's score. In addition to featuring existing works by Johann Strauss II, Wolfgang Amadeus Mozart, Ennio Morricone, and Franz Schubert, Zimmer included elements from authentic Romani music. Zimmer, accompanied by director Guy Ritchie and some of Zimmer's musicians, traveled to France, Italy, and Slovakia to research the local music firsthand and to "listen to as many musicians as we could." Deeply impressed, Zimmer arranged for 13 of the local musicians—with their personal violins and accordions—to join him in Vienna at a studio for a recording session. Zimmer incorporated this Romani music into the score for the film. It was reported a portion of proceeds from the soundtrack would be given to the impoverished Romani villages to help pay for necessities, such as water and heat.

Release

Sherlock Holmes: A Game of Shadows was released on 16 December 2011 in Canada, Mexico, Russia, the United States, the United Kingdom; on 25 December 2011 in most other countries; and on 5 January 2012 in Australia, Poland, and Spain.

Home media
The film was released on DVD and Blu-ray on 12 June 2012 for Region 1 and 14 May 2012 for Region 2 and Region 4.

Reception

Box office
Sherlock Holmes: A Game of Shadows earned $186.8 million in North America as well as $357 million in other territories for a worldwide total of $543.4 million. It was the 12th highest-grossing film of 2011 worldwide.

In North America, it topped the box office on its opening day with $14.6 million, down from the opening-day gross of the previous film, $24.6 million. During the weekend, it grossed $39.6 million, leading the box office but earning approximately two-thirds as much as its predecessor on its opening weekend. By the end of its theatrical run, it became the 9th highest-grossing film of 2011 in the US.

Outside North America, the film earned $14.6 million on its opening weekend, finishing in third place. It topped the overseas box office during three consecutive weekends in January 2012. It eventually surpassed its predecessor's foreign total of $315 million. In the UK, Ireland, and Malta, its highest-grossing market after North America, the film achieved a first-place opening of £3.83 million ($5.95 million) over a three-day period, compared to the £3.08 million earned in two days by the original film. It earned $42.2 million in total in this market. In the Commonwealth of Independent States and in Italy, the film earned $28.4 million and $24.5 million, respectively.

Critical response
Review aggregator website Rotten Tomatoes reports an approval rating of 59% based on 229 reviews, with an average rating of 6/10. The site's critical consensus reads, "Sherlock Holmes: A Game of Shadows is a good yarn thanks to its well-matched leading men but overall stumbles duplicating the well-oiled thrills of the original." Metacritic, which assigns a weighted average rating to reviews, gives the film a score of 48 out of 100, based on 38 critics, indicating "mixed or average reviews". Audiences polled by CinemaScore gave the film an average grade of "A−" on an A+ to F scale, higher than the previous film's "B".

Roger Ebert, who gave the first film three stars, was even more positive in his review for the sequel, awarding it three-and-a-half stars and calling it "high-caliber entertainment" that "add[s] a degree of refinement and invention" to the formula. He also said the writers "wisely devote some of their best scenes to one-on-ones between Holmes and Moriarty." James Berardinelli gave the film three stars out of four, writing, "A Game of Shadows is a stronger, better-realized movie that builds upon the strengths of the original and jettisons some of the weaknesses." Conversely, Keith Phipps of The A.V. Club felt the film "aims lower than its predecessor's modest ambition and still misses the mark." Several critics felt that McAdams was underused. Joe Morgenstern of The Wall Street Journal felt "she vanishes all too soon in this overproduced, self-enchanted sequel, and so does the spirit of bright invention that made the previous film such a pleasant surprise." Scott Mendelson of The Huffington Post remarked that she "exhibits far more personality and roguish charm in her few moments here than she did in all of the previous film. Freed from the constraints of being the de-facto love interest, McAdams relishes the chance to go full-villain." Similarly, Charlotte Skeoch was critical, not just of McAdams' cameo, but of Reilly's and Rapace's roles, especially with the former, even panning Sim's characterisation. She also criticizes Fry's small role and gave the film a mixed review. Conversely, Emmet Asher-Perrin of Tor.com said "I was sort of thrilled that Irene Adler was taken out of the picture so quickly. While I didn’t mind the position the character occupied in the narrative of the last movie, Rachel McAdams’ Adler never meshed well with this particular Holmes. The near-paternal tint in his affection for her was bothersome, and not missed this time around".

On 24 November 2015, film critic Scout Tafoya of RogerEbert.com included A Game of Shadows in his video series "The Unloved", where he highlights films which received mixed to negative reviews yet he believes to have artistic value. He praised the film's deconstruction of action scenes through stylistic editing, one inspired by Soviet montage which was exemplified in Sergei Eisenstein's 1925 film Battleship Potemkin, as well as the friendship and constant banter between Holmes and Watson at the center of the film, which "highlight[s] the difficulty in achieving lyrical deftness of dialogue in films of this budget", with their friendship reminding Tafoya of how "we can invite danger and fun into our lives in equal measure all the time, but once in a blue moon, they make life worth living." Tafoya considers A Game of Shadows to be his eighth favorite film of the 21st century.

Accolades

Future

Sequel

Warner Bros. Pictures announced in October 2011 that the first draft for Sherlock Holmes 3 was being produced with screenwriter Drew Pearce
writing the script; he was later replaced by Justin Haythe. Jude Law commented on the project in late 2013, "We had a meeting earlier this year, the three of us, and I think it's being written now. Warner Bros. have still got to agree to pay for it... I think they want to!" He also said of the delay in getting into production, "I think Warner Bros. wants it, and there's a lot of want from us as a team. We want it to be better than the other two. We want to make sure it's smarter and cleverer, but in the same realm. It's a slow process. We're all busy. So getting us together to try to nail that has taken a little bit longer than we had hoped... I hate celebrating anything I've done, but I'm so proud of those films. I think it was Joel Silver who said, 'Take it out of that dusty room and put it on the street'."

In October 2014, Susan Downey stated that a third film was in development: "There's an idea, there's an outline, there is not a script yet. Trust me, the studio would love there to be a script. But our feeling is, we gotta get it right." When asked whether the film would realistically be out within the "next few years", she expressed confidence that it would be, saying, "Yeah. At a certain point it's going to be too long— we've waited too long. We're working as fast and responsibly as we can to get a great script." In May 2015, when asked of the progress of the third film in an interview, Law stated: "There is apparently still a will [to do it], there is a script being written, but I'm not sure."

In August 2015, while promoting Ritchie's film The Man from U.N.C.L.E., producer Lionel Wigram said that a script for a third film was still being written. Wigram also claimed that both Downey Jr. and Law would reprise their roles from the first two films. In April 2016, Downey confirmed that the film would begin shooting later in the year. That same month, it was announced that James Coyne was hired to rewrite the script. Silver, who will produce the sequel, stated that he hoped it would begin filming in the fall, and that there may be more sequels.

In October 2016, Warner Bros., Village Roadshow and Team Downey had put together a writers' room with several top names, including Nicole Perlman, Justin Malen, Gary Whitta, Geneva Robertson-Dworet and Kieran Fitzgerald.

In May 2017, Wigram claimed that shooting may start in late 2018, saying, "It's closer to happening than it's been for a while. With any luck we'll be making it at the end of next year. I hope, we'll see. Fingers crossed." In May 2018, Warner Bros. confirmed a third film was scheduled for release on December 25, 2020, with Downey, Law, and Anderson reprising their roles and Chris Brancato writing the script.

In March 2019, Warner Bros. announced that the release date had been changed to December 22, 2021. In July 2019, Dexter Fletcher was announced to replace Ritchie as the film's director. That same month, the film was approved a $20.9 million tax break by the California Film Commission, against a projected production budget of $107.8 million.

In June 2021, Fletcher stated the film was delayed indefinitely due to the ongoing COVID-19 pandemic, saying, "We started going and then Covid hit, and they were like, 'Look we're going to stand it down and Robert has got something else he wants to do'...These things are so big that you don't wanna just chisel them into something... I know that Robert will not let that fish off the hook." In February 2023, Ritchie stated that it was being left up to Downey whether the third film would resume development.

Franchise
By October 2020, Robert Downey Jr. and Susan Downey announced plans to expand the film series into a franchise. Team Downey is working on installments including additional films, spin-offs, television series for HBO Max, and other media in a shared universe. Though they do not intend to copy the Marvel Cinematic Universe, the pair acknowledged that they felt that working with Marvel Studios taught them much with regards to world building. Two television series set in the films' universe are in development for HBO Max.

References

External links

 
 
 
 
 

Sherlock Holmes films
2011 films
2011 action thriller films
2010s mystery films
American action thriller films
American mystery films
American sequel films
British action thriller films
British sequel films
Columbia Pictures films
D-Box motion-enhanced films
Films shot at Elstree Film Studios
2010s English-language films
Films about Romani people
Films about terrorism
Films directed by Guy Ritchie
Films produced by Joel Silver
Films produced by Dan Lin
Films scored by Hans Zimmer
Films set in 1891
Films set in England
Films shot in Hertfordshire
Films shot in Worcestershire
Films set in London
Films set in France
Films set in Paris
Films set in Germany
Films set in Switzerland
Films shot in France
Films shot in London
Films shot in Switzerland
Silver Pictures films
Steampunk films
Village Roadshow Pictures films
Warner Bros. films
2010s buddy films
2010s American films
2010s British films
Films shot in Alsace